This is a list of bacon substitutes. A number of substitutes exist for people who, for ethical, environmental, health, religious, or other reasons, prefer not to eat bacon. The flavor of smoked paprika resembles cooked bacon to some people.

Bacon substitutes

See also

 List of bacon dishes
 List of meat substitutes
 Meat analogue
 Vegetarian bacon

References

Bacon substitutes
Bacon
Substitutes